Cerithiopsina signa is a species of very small sea snails, marine gastropod molluscs in the family Cerithiopsidae. It was described by Bartsch in 1921.

References

Cerithiopsidae
Gastropods described in 1921